Collinswood is a suburb of Adelaide spanning the boundary of the Prospect and the Port Adelaide Enfield local government areas.

Adelaide's Australian Broadcasting Corporation Studios are located in the suburb on the corner of North East Road and Galway Avenue.

Hampstead Post Office opened around 1927 and was renamed Collinswood in 1964.

History
In 1838 George Fife Angas selected "country section" 474 in the later-proclaimed Hundred of Yatala. He had been given the right to make first choice of a country section, to which he and other early investors in South Australia were entitled by their purchase of land orders prior to settlement (see Lands administrative divisions of South Australia § Land division history). The bounds of section 474 correspond almost exactly with the present-day Collinwood, but the triangle of land was split, in the early days, between the suburb of Rosebery, in the south, and Collinswood, in the north.

Population
In the 2016 Census, there were 1,384 people in Collinswood. 65.8% of people were born in Australia and 68.3% of people spoke only English at home. The most common responses for religion were No Religion 34.0%, Catholic 17.4% and Anglican 10.3%.

References	

 	
	

Suburbs of Adelaide